Bruce Holbert (born October 4, 1959) is an American writer.  He is the author of the novels Lonesome Animals (Counterpoint Press),  and the Hour of Lead (Counterpoint Press) which won the 2015 Washington State Book Award for Fiction and Whiskey (Farrar Straus & Giroux)

Early life/education
Holbert graduated from Lake Roosevelt High School in Coulee Dam in the spring of 1978, then attended Eastern Washington University where he graduated with a degree in English/Education in 1983. He graduated with an MFA from the University of Iowa Writers Workshop in 1990

In 1982, Holbert inadvertently shot and killed one of his friends in a gun accident. Charges against Holbert were eventually dropped. Holbert has stated that he remains "numbed by guilt."

References

External links
Biography at Counterpoint Press
Interview at The Pacific Northwest Inlander

21st-century American novelists
American crime fiction writers
American male novelists
1959 births
Living people
American male short story writers
21st-century American short story writers
21st-century American male writers